Mostafa Hashemi (Born 1962) is an Iranian basketball coach.

He was a player of Iran national basketball team, also coach of Mahram Basketball club, Chemidor Tehran BC and assistant coach of Iran national basketball team.

References 

Living people

1962 births
Iranian basketball coaches
Iranian men's basketball players